CBM College of Arts and Science is located in Sakethpuri, Kovaipudur, Coimbatore, India. The college is affiliated to Bharathiar University.

Courses
The college offers undergraduate and postgraduate courses. It has both government-aided and self-financed courses.

References

External links
Official website

Universities and colleges in Coimbatore
Colleges affiliated to Bharathiar University